The 1987 Heinz Southern 500, the 38th running of the event, was a NASCAR Winston Cup Series race held on September 6, 1987 at Darlington Raceway in Darlington, South Carolina. Contested over 202 laps – shortened from 367 laps due to rain – on the 1.366 mile (2.198 km) speedway, it was the 21st race of the 1987 NASCAR Winston Cup Series season. Dale Earnhardt of Richard Childress Racing won the race.

Race report
Johnathan Lee Edwards would make his final NASCAR career start while Richard Petty would finish in the "top ten" for the 700th time in his career.

The last race attempt for Tim Richmond sees him withdraw for health reasons, then resign from Hendrick Motorsports later in the month. An attempted comeback in 1988 was ultimately not to be, due to a highly controversial "positive" drug test that barred him for the 1988 season. He was reinstated later in the year after a settled lawsuit, but could not find a ride, and ultimately never raced again before his death in 1989.

Alan Kulwicki had engine problems on lap 77; picking up his only last place-finish. Harry Gant could handle his vehicle's clutch and had to exit the race on lap 95. Greg Sacks' engine gave out on lap 96 while Johnathan Lee Edwards had the same problem on lap 122. Trevor Boys inflicted terminal vehicle damage on lap 126 while fatigue ended H.B. Bailey's race on lap 133. Connie Saylor would pass out due to exhaustion on lap 140. Bobby Allison blew his vehicle's engine on lap 185 while a troublesome distributor ended Buddy Baker's race on lap 199.

The battle for the win turned into a showdown between Earnhardt and Richard Petty; Petty gunned past Earnhardt on a Lap 188 restart but Earnhardt retook the lead on lap 191 just before rain brought out what would be the race-ending yellow at Lap 198. This was the first Darlington race with more than 10 cars on the lead lap despite rain ending it early. Rookie sensation Davey Allison won the pole and led 86 laps but crashed in the fourth turn at Lap 164; the crash swept up Lake Speed while Mike Potter spun behind them and was drilled by Benny Parsons.

Qualifying

Top 10 finishers

Race statistics
The race had the following properties:
 Time of race: 2:23:19
 Average Speed: 
 Pole Speed: 
 Cautions: 5 for 50 laps
 Margin of Victory: under caution
 Lead changes: 13
 Percent of race run under caution: 24.8%         
 Average green flag run: 38 laps

References

 Southern 500
Southern 500
Southern 500
NASCAR races at Darlington Raceway